I Stand Alone is the 1969 debut album of American singer-songwriter Al Kooper, issued on Columbia Records. It was recorded after his collaboration with Michael Bloomfield and Stephen Stills on the 1968 album Super Session.

Background
After ten years of session playing, collaborations and playing in other bands, Kooper released his first solo album in February, 1969. It is an eclectic mix of country, soul, blues, and rock with a dose of psychedelia mixed throughout. It is a continuation of Super Session in its mix of disparate covers from the likes of Bill Monroe, Harry Nilsson and Traffic, and with originals running the gamut of feelings.

Unlike the Super Session  album, however, the spotlight is on Kooper alone and Kooper's alternate utilization of orchestras and professional Nashville studio musicians; the tracks are far more focused, all within two and five minutes. "Camille" is lifted from  "Overture to Le Domino Noire" by French composer Daniel Auber.

Most tracks are bridged with sound effects taken from albums issued by Elektra Records.  The Overture begins with a collage of sound effects also taken from those albums. The album was on the Billboard 200 chart for 13 weeks, peaking at number 54 on March 15, 1969.

Track listing
All tracks composed by Al Kooper; except where indicated
 "Overture" – 4:39
 "I Stand Alone" – 3:37
 "Camille" (Kooper, Tony Powers) – 2:54
 "One" (Harry Nilsson) – 2:53
 "Coloured Rain" (Steve Winwood, Jim Capaldi, Chris Wood) – 3:01
 "Soft Landing on the Moon" – 3:58
 "I Can Love a Woman" – 3:28
 "Blue Moon of Kentucky" (Bill Monroe) – 2:14
 "Toe Hold" (Isaac Hayes, David Porter) – 3:53
 "Right Now for You" – 2:33
 "Hey, Western Union Man" (Jerry Butler, Kenny Gamble, Leon Huff) – 3:43
 "Song and Dance for the Unborn, Frightened Child" – 4:31

Personnel

Musicians
Al Kooper – piano, organ, ondioline, guitars, vocals, orchestrations (track 5)
Wayne Moss – guitar (tracks 2, 8, 9, 10, and 11)
Jerry Kennedy – guitar (tracks 2, 8 [solo], 9, 10, and 11) 
"Big" Charlie Daniels – guitar (tracks 2, 8, 9, 10, and 11)
Charlie McCoy – electric bass, (tracks 2, 8, 9, 10, and 11), orchestrations (track 8) 
Ken Buttrey – drums (tracks 2, 8, 9, 10, and 11)
The Blossoms – backing vocals (tracks 2, 7, 9, 10, and 11)
Charlie Calello – orchestrations (tracks 3 and 7)
Don Ellis – orchestrations (track 5)
Jimmy Wisner – orchestrations (tracks 1, 4, and 12)

Technical
Al Kooper – producer
Brian Ross-Myring, Charlie Bragg, Don Puluse, Fred Catero, Glen Kolotkin, Neil Wilburn – engineers

References

External links
 
 

1968 debut albums
Columbia Records albums
Al Kooper albums
Albums conducted by Charles Calello
Albums produced by Al Kooper